Florent Nédélec is a French architect. He studied architecture in France and the United States and graduated with a “Diplôme d’Architecte DPLG” from the École nationale supérieure d'architecture de Paris-La Villette in Paris, France and a Master of Architecture from the Georgia Institute of Technology in Atlanta, USA. Florent Nédélec is a registered architect with “l’Ordre des architectes d’Île-de-France” in Paris, France. His projects reflect a sensibility for minimalism.

Biography 
Prior to starting his own practice in 2007, Florent Nédélec worked with several architectural firms, including Atelier Jean Nouvel and Pei Cobb Freed & Partners Architects LLP, formerly known as I.M. Pei & Partners. He later became a principal of the New York architectural firm Frank Williams & Partners Architects LLP to work on multiple high-rise buildings in New York, Dubai and Moscow.

Practice 
Nédélec's firm has offices in Central, Hong Kong and Phuket.

Projects 
Nédélec has designed a number of buildings across the world:
2015, Usherea Villa, Phuket, Thailand
2015, Eight South Lane, Sai Wan, Hong Kong
2014, Queen's Road Hotel, Central, Hong Kong
2014, Yong He Yuan Residences, Taipei, Taiwan
2012, Whitfield Hotel, North Point, Hong Kong
2012, The Jervois, Sheung Wan, Hong Kong
2008, Bonham Strand Hotel, Central, Hong Kong
2007, 3 West 57 Residential Tower, New York (with Frank Williams & Partners Architects LLP)
2007, Connaught Road Office Building, Central, Hong Kong (with Frank Williams & Partners Architects LLP)

See also 
 List of architects
 List of French architects

References

External links
 Nedelec Architecture official site
 Air France Magazine 2012, May 2012, 10 raisons to go to Hong Kong
 China Times, May 2012, 置產避險挑地段品牌首選雍河院
 MyGoNews, January 2011, Interview with Mr.Cheng
 Squarefoot HK Magazine, May 2012, Sustaining Momentum

21st-century French architects
Living people
Year of birth missing (living people)